The 1929 New South Wales Rugby Football League premiership was the 22nd season of Sydney's top-level rugby league football competition, Australia's first.  During the season, which lasted from April until September, nine teams from across Sydney contested the premiership, culminating in a South Sydney's win over Newtown in the final.

Season summary
Half of the 1929 season was played without several of the League's top players who were selected to embark on the 1929–30 Kangaroo tour of Great Britain. South Sydney won their ninth premiership and fifth in succession, defeating Newtown in the Final.

Teams
At the end of 1929 Glebe exited the League because of a lack of a home ground, poor results and primarily because the area they represented was no longer big enough to support a club.
 Balmain, formed on January 23, 1908, at Balmain Town Hall
 Eastern Suburbs, formed on January 24, 1908, at Paddington Town Hall
 Glebe, formed on January 9, 1908
 Newtown, formed on January 8, 1908
 North Sydney, formed on February 7, 1908
 South Sydney, formed on January 17, 1908, at Redfern Town Hall
 St. George, formed on November 8, 1920, at Kogarah School of Arts
 Western Suburbs, formed on February 4, 1908
 University, formed in 1919 at Sydney University

Ladder

Finals

Premiership final

South Sydney took their fifth successive title outgunning Newtown 30–10 after leading 18–2 at half-time.

The Whiticker/Collis reference quotes Sydney's Labor Daily in praise of Souths' win: "Newtown faced inevitable defeat, and while the margin was large, it hardly demonstrated South Sydney's superiority. They were on top from the start and gave a scintillating display both in combination and individual effort. Alf Blair played probably the greatest game in his long career".

Brothers Alf and Frank O'Connor both scored tries for the winning Rabbitohs. The next time two brothers would each score a try in a premiership decider was when Brett and Glenn Stewart scored for Manly-Warringah in their 2011 NRL Grand Final win over New Zealand.

South Sydney 30 (Tries: Alf Blair 3, Reg Williams 3, Frank O'Connor, Alf O'Connor. Goals: Alf Blair 2, Reg Williams)

defeated

Newtown 10 (Tries: Ben Edwards 2. Goals: George Casey 2)

References

External links
 Whiticker, Alan  & Collis, Ian (2006) The History of Rugby League Clubs, New Holland, Sydney
 Rugby League Tables - Season 1929 AFL Tables
 Results: 1921-30 at rabbitohs.com.au

New South Wales Rugby League premiership
NSWRFL season